Albrecht Christoph Müller (4 November 193924 May 2018) was a rower who competed for West Germany. In 1964 he joined the German coxless four rowing team, winning a European title and finishing sixth at the 1964 Summer Olympics. He served as the president of the RC Germania Düsseldorf from 1990 until his retirement in 2000, at which point the new role of honorary chairman was created for him. He died in 2018.

His son Linus Müller represented Germany in field hockey at the 2020 Summer Olympics.

References

External links

 
 
 
 Rudern  Europameisterschaften (Herren – Vierer o.Stm.)

1939 births
2018 deaths
West German male rowers
Olympic rowers of the United Team of Germany
Rowers at the 1964 Summer Olympics
European Rowing Championships medalists
Sportspeople from Oldenburg